Class Action Park is a 2020 documentary film. The documentary's subject is the American amusement park Action Park, which was located in Vernon Township, New Jersey and was known for the popularity it had among locals and infamous for the poor safety record of the attractions located on its grounds.

The film premiered virtually at the 2020 Florida Film Festival and was released a week later on HBO Max.

The film premiered on TNT on December 27, 2021.

Plot 
Class Action Park begins by chronicling the life of penny stockbroker Eugene Mulvihill, who is described as having become rich from pump-and-dump schemes. It outlines his path to opening Vernon Township's Action Park in 1978. He envisioned it as a park with "no rules".

The first two-thirds of the film features former Action Park guests and employees reflecting on the park's more dangerous rides, such as the Cannonball Loop, the SuperSpeed Waterfalls, the Alpine Slides and the Tarzan Swings, and reflects on the park itself and its general atmosphere and culture. The life of Eugene Mulvihill is also chronicled, including a discussion of his legal issues, which often involved Action Park. For example, a land dispute with the state of New Jersey is said to have been resolved after the state got tired of dealing with him.

The last third of the film focuses on the dangers of Action Park by chronicling the deaths that occurred there, as well as documenting the story of George Larsson Jr.'s death while riding the Alpine Slides in 1980, which was the first death at Action Park. It was covered up by the park in order to avoid reporting his death to New Jersey authorities. It was claimed that they didn't need to, as he was not a member of the general public. Action Park claimed that Larsson died as an employee of the park riding the slide at night during a rain shower, but in fact, all three claims were untrue. The suggestion that Mulvihill corrupted Vernon Township officials during Action Park's existence is also mentioned, as are the downfall of the park and Mulvihill's death. The film ends with the interviewees reflecting on Action Park as a whole, with one stating that its vision continues to live on in schemes such as Fyre Festival and Theranos. Another calls it an '80s movie in real life that will never happen again. Footage of George Larsson Jr.'s mother and younger brother visiting his grave is shown.

The film also mentions that Donald Trump considered investing in the park at one point, but  backed out after finding Mulvihill's vision for the park to be too risky.

Cast
 John Hodgman - Narrator
 Chris Gethard
 Alison Becker
 Jim DeSaye (former Action Park security director)
 Esther Larsson (mother of George Larsson Jr.)
 Faith Anderson (former Action Park lifeguard)
 Jason Scott
 Ed Youmans (former Action Park Manager of Operations)

Reception 
Class Action Park was the number one film on HBO Max for the week following its premiere date of August 27, 2020. The film has been praised by many critics for pointing out the dark side of the park and talking about the people who died at the park, as opposed to glorifying the park's nostalgia. The website's critics consensus reads, "Disturbing and thrilling in equal measure, Class Action Park is a raucous chronicle of the infamous water park that was as beloved as it was dangerous."

References

External links
 
 

2020 films
American documentary films
Films set in New Jersey
HBO Max films
Vernon Township, New Jersey
2020s English-language films
2020s American films